The Royal Society of Victoria (RSV) is the oldest scientific society in the state of Victoria in Australia.

Foundation

In 1854 two organisations formed with similar aims and membership, these being The Philosophical Society of Victoria (founded 15 June, 1854, inaugural president Andrew Clarke) and The Victorian Institute for the Advancement of Science (founded 12 August, 1854, inaugural president Justice Sir Redmond Barry). These two merged in July 1855 to form the Philosophical Institute of Victoria, with Clarke as the inaugural president. The Philosophical Institute received Royal Charter in 1859, and the first president of the freshly renamed Royal Society of Victoria was Ferdinand von Mueller (later Baron Sir Ferdinand von Mueller), then Victoria's Government Botanist. In 1860 the RSV organised the ill-fated Burke and Wills expedition under the Presidency of Victorian Governor Sir Henry Barkly.

Activities

The Society has played an important role in the life of Melbourne and Victoria, including a foundational relationship with the Melbourne Museum, the Royal Botanic Gardens Victoria, the Melbourne Observatory and Victoria's National Parks. The Society convened the first Australian Antarctic Exploration Committee in 1885, commissioned the Burke and Wills expedition and established the Victorian Institute of Marine Sciences in 1978 (now the Marine and Freshwater Discovery Centre in Queenscliff). Many long-standing community organisations concerned with nature and conservation have grown from an early association with the Royal Society of Victoria, such as the Victorian National Parks Association and the Field Naturalists Club of Victoria.

Located in its heritage-listed headquarters at 8 La Trobe Street, in the centre of Melbourne, the Society's modern role is to communicate and advocate for the important role of science in society, providing public lectures about the latest scientific work and thinking underway in Victoria, and convening forums with government and community to explore an evidence-based approach to issues facing the state. The Society conducts a state-wide program through management of the Inspiring Victoria program, a federally-funded initiative to engage communities with science and promote scientific literacy, including National Science Week.

The Society edits and produces the Proceedings of the Royal Society of Victoria, one of Australia's longest-running regional science journals. Back issues from the 19th century through to the early 21st century are digitised and accessible from the State Library of Victoria's online catalogue, along with holdings of the Society's historical papers and archives. Issues published from 2009 are available online, open access through CSIRO Publishing.

Awards

The Society confers prizes, awards and medals to recognise high-achievement throughout a scientist's various career stages. RSV bursaries are provided to school students through annual sponsorship of the Science Talent Search run by the Science Teachers' Association of Victoria. Early career researchers are acknowledged annually through the Young Scientist Research Prizes and the Phillip Law Postdoctoral Award. Peak career achievements are recognised through the annual award of the RSV Medal for Excellence in Scientific Research. Distinguished lifetime contributions to science, in particular the public engagement with and understanding of science, are recognised through election as an RSV Fellow.

Fellows of the Royal Society of Victoria are entitled to the use of the professional postnominal FRSV; subscribed members of the RSV are entitled to use of the professional postnominal MRSV.

Presidents

 1859: Baron Sir Ferdinand von Mueller
 1860-1863: Sir Henry Barkly
 1864: Sir Frederick McCoy
 1865: Rev. Dr John Ignatius Bleasdale
 1866-1884: Robert L.J. Ellery
 1885-1900: William Charles Kernot
 1901: Dr James Jamieson
 1902: Edward John White
 1903: John Dennant
 1904: Sir Walter Baldwin Spencer
 1905: George Sweet
 1906: Edward John Dunn
 1907: Calder E. Oliver
 1908-1909: Pietro P.G.E. Baracchi
 1910-1911: Ernest Willington Skeats
 1912-1913: John Shephard
 1914-1915: Thomas Sergeant Hall
 1916-1917: William A. Osborne
 1918-1919: James A. Kershaw
 1920-1921: Alfred James Ewart
 1922-1923: Frank Wisewould
 1924: Thomas H. Laby
 1925-1926: Joseph M. Baldwin
 1927-1928: Wilfred Eade Agar
 1929-1930: Frederick Chapman
 1931-1932: Herbert S. Summers
 1933-1934: William J. Young
 1935-1936: Norman A. Esserman
 1937-1938: Samuel M. Wadham
 1939-1940: Daniel J. Mahony
 1941-1942: Reuben T. Patton
 1943-1944: William Baragwanath
 1945-1946: John King Davis
 1947-1948: Dermot A. Casey
 1949-1950: Philip Crosbie Morrison
 1951-1952: John S. Turner
 1953-1954: Frank Leslie Stillwell
 1955-1956: Edwin S. Hills
 1957-1958: Valentine G. Anderson
 1959-1960: Geoffrey W. Leeper
 1961-1962: Richard R. Garran
 1963-1964: Richard T.M. Pescott
 1965-1966: John H. Chinner
 1967-1968: Phillip G. Law
 1969-1970: Edmund D. Gill
 1971-1972: Alfred Dunbavin Butcher
 1973-1974: Sir Robert R. Blackwood
 1975-1976: James D. Morrison
 1977-1978: John F. Lovering AO
 1979-1980: Lionel L. Stubbs
 1980-1982: Gordon D. Aitchison
 1983-1984: David M. Churchill
 1985-1986: Dr Grisha A. Sklovsky
 1986-1987: Dr Terence P. O'Brien
 1987 (Jul-Dec): Dr Grisha A. Sklovsky
 1988-1990: Dr William R.S. Briggs
 1991-1992: Dr Graeme F. Watson
 1993-1994: Dr John W. Zillman AO
 1995-1996: Dr Maxwell G. Lay AM
 1997-1998: Professor Em. Herbert H. Bolotin
 1999-2001: Associate Professor Gordon D. Sanson
 2001-2003: Associate Professor Neil W. Archbold
 2006-2007: Associate Professor Bruce Livett
 2007-2010: Professor Graham D. Burrows AO
 2010-2012: Professor Lynne Selwood AO
 2013-2017: Dr William D. (Bill) Birch AM
 2017-2021: Mr David Zerman
 2021-    : Mr Robert Gell AM

Publication
 Proceedings of the Royal Society of Victoria. Melbourne : The Society, 1889-  Semiannual. ISSN 0035-9211.  Formerly the Transactions and Proceedings of the Royal Society of Victoria

See also
 List of Royal Societies
 Burke and Wills expedition
 List of physics awards

References

 Science and the making of Victoria.
 Presidents of the Royal Society of Victoria.

External links 
 The Royal Society of Victoria The Royal Society of Victoria's web site.
 The Royal Society of Victoria Building Tour Virtual tour of the headquarters of The Royal Society of Victoria headquarters in Melbourne.
 CSIRO Publishing Current, open access editions of the Proceedings of the Royal Society of Victoria published online by CSIRO Publishing.
 State Library of Victoria, Digitised Collections Access to the digitised Transactions and Proceedings of the Royal Society of Victoria, together with those of its foundation societies.
 The RSV's Australian Eclipse Expedition to Cape York in 1871 An account of the RSV's Australian Eclipse Expedition to Cape York in 1871 in the Journal of Astronomy History and Heritage by Dr Nick Lomb.
 Burke & Wills Web A comprehensive website containing many of the historical documents relating to the Victorian Exploring (Burke & Wills) Expedition.
 Burke & Wills 150th A website recording the activities for the Commemoration of the 150th Anniversary of the Victorian Exploring Expedition (Burke and Wills).
 The Burke & Wills Historical Society The Burke & Wills Historical Society.

Society of Victoria, Royal
Organizations established in 1859
Clubs and societies in Victoria (Australia)
Learned societies of Australia
1859 establishments in Australia